St Mark Coptic Orthodox Church (Coptic:  // transliteration: ti.eklyseya en.remenkimi en.orthodoxos ente fi.ethowab Markos) is a Coptic Orthodox church in Los Angeles and is one of the oldest Coptic parishes established in the United States. It is one of over 200 Coptic Orthodox churches in the US.

History of the Church
St. Mark's Coptic Orthodox Church of Los Angeles was founded as the second Coptic parish in the United States, and was incorporated by 1970 with about 200 families at the time. The Coptic families in Los Angeles started settling from around the late 1960s when the late Father Bishoy Kamel was commissioned to serve the church in 1969, during Pope Cyril VI's papacy. Fr. Bishoy was a prominent Copt, being considered a modern-day saint within the Church, and helped to found not only St. Mark's but several other parishes and buildings throughout Egypt, the United States, Europe and Australia.

The congregation initially used a Syriac Orthodox building to accommodate its liturgies. Then, the congregation eventually purchased the current building which was previously used by the Russian Orthodox. Several years later, in 1995, the Coptic Orthodox Diocese of Los Angeles, Southern California and Hawaii was founded. Pope Shenouda III, the Pope of Alexandria (at the time), enthroned HG Serapion as Bishop for the diocese, which includes St. Mark's Church as well as several other diocese churches. There are currently about 650 Coptic families served by St. Mark's Church with several others belonging to different church congregations throughout California.

See also
Coptic Orthodox Church
Seat of the Coptic Orthodox Pope of Alexandria
Coptic architecture
Coptic Cairo
Coptic Orthodox Church in North America

References

External links
Official website

Coptic Orthodox churches in California
Churches in Los Angeles
Middle Eastern-American culture in Los Angeles
Christian organizations established in 1970
Oriental Orthodox congregations established in the 20th century